Robert Everett Pattison (August 19, 1800 – November 21, 1874) was an American clergyman, and served as both the third and sixth president of Colby College.

Life

He graduated at Amherst College in 1826, was appointed a tutor in Columbian College, D. C, was ordained in 1829, and in 1830 became pastor of the First Baptist Church in America in Providence, RI. From this post he was called to a professorship in Waterville College (now Colby College in Maine, of which he was president from 1836 to 1840. He then became pastor of the second Baptist church of St. Louis, Mo., and in 1841 returned to his pastoral charge at Providence. In 1843 he was elected one of the corresponding secretaries of the Baptist Board of Foreign Missions. He was president and professor of Christian theology in the western Baptist theological institute, at Covington, Ky., from 1845 to 1848, when he was appointed to a similar professorship in the Newton Theological Seminary, Mass., from which he was again called to the presidency of Waterville college in 1853. In 1858 he resigned and took charge of the Oread Institute, at Worcester, Mass. He was professor of systematic theology in Shurtleff College, Alton, 111., from 1864 to 1870, when he was called to a professorship in the Baptist theological seminary of Chicago, which he resigned on account of ill health in 1874. For one year he was acting president of the old university of Chicago.

Publications
 Commentary, Explanatory, Doctrinal, and Practical, on the Epistle to the Ephesians (Boston, 1859).

References

1800 births
1874 deaths
Presidents of Colby College
American clergy
Amherst College alumni
Andover Newton Theological School faculty
19th-century American clergy